Shotts is a town in North Lanarkshire, Scotland. It is located almost halfway between Glasgow and Edinburgh. The village has a population of about 8,840. A local story has Shotts being named after the legendary giant highwayman Bertram de Shotts, though toponymists give the Anglo-Saxon  ("steep slopes") as the real source of the name.
Shotts is the home of the 2015 world champion pipe band, Shotts and Dykehead Caledonia Pipe Band.

History
Until 1457 Shotts was part of the Lanarkshire parish of Bothwell. Groome related that the pre-reformation church of Bertramshotts is mentioned in a Papal bull in 1476. The parish, one of the largest in Lowland Scotland, was sometimes called Shotts but officially it was known as Bertram Shotts.

In 1831 the Duke of Hamilton owned most of the land.

Shotts was known for its mining and ironworks. The Shotts Iron Company was first established in 1801 and provided employment for Shotts and the surrounding area for 150 years, and was eventually wound up in 1952. These were developed when transport by canal and railway became possible. By the late 1800s the ironworks had grown to the extent that the village slogan was "Shotts lights the world", as gas lamp standards made here were exported throughout the British Empire and beyond. In the years leading up to World War II there were 22 coal mines in the area, but Northfield Colliery, the last of these, closed in the 1960s.

Geography

Shotts is south of the M8 in North Lanarkshire between Wishaw and Harthill. Historically the Shotts Iron Works were between Calderhead, source of the South Calder Water, and Stane. Shotts parish was originally made up of five villages: Dykehead, Calderside, Stane, Springhill and Torbothie; all growing up around the old coach roads between Glasgow and Edinburgh that expanded and merged during the 18th and 19th centuries following the growth in mining.

Nearby is Kirk o' Shotts transmitting station.

Knowhoble Hill

Knowhoble Hill, lying beside Teilling Burn, was the site of adwelling belonging to the Cleland (Clevland) family.

Sport

Shotts has a number of sports facilitated in the local community. Shotts Golf Club, an 18-hole course founded in 1895, is to the North-East of the village. On the first Saturday in June each year, Shotts hosts its own Highland Games in Hannah Park.

Football Teams
 AFC Hartwood
Shotts Bon Accord
Shotts Vics
Shotts YMCA
Springhill AFC
Dykehead F.C.
Torbothie Rose
 Shotts Albion
 Shotts Thistle

HMP Shotts
HMP Shotts, a high security prison holding male prisoners with maximum security classification, is located between Shotts and Salsburgh. It opened in 1978 and provided a new source of employment after the closure of the mines.

Transport
The village is served by Shotts railway station, which is connected on the Shotts Line between Glasgow and Edinburgh.

Schools Within Shotts
St.Patrick's Primary
Stane Primary
Dykehead Primary
Calderhead High School

Notable Shotts people

Mick McGahey Scottish miners' leader
Matthew Baillie anatomist
Michelle Barr, Scotland women's international footballer.
Hugh Dallas Scottish and international football referee
William Grossart, Esq., Surgeon. — wrote "Historic Notices and Domestic History of the Parish of Shotts" in 1880.
Gavin Hamilton
Margaret Herbison, Member of Parliament
Andrew Keir, actor
George MacBeth, writer
 Col Donald James MacKintosh FRSE, soldier and physician
Louise Murphy Councillor
Catriona Shearer, newsreader, journalist and television presenter.
James “Gentleman Jim” Rodger, former pit worker and famous for being a football journalist and “Scottish footballs ‘Mr Fixit’”. Renowned for facilitating player transfers and helping managers into jobs. Described by Alex Ferguson as his “mentor”.

References

External links
 
 Shotts Bon Accord FC 
 Shotts History Group 
 A brief history of Shotts 
 Shotts and Dykehead Caledonia Pipe Band
 Video footage of Shotts railway station.
 Video footage of the Fortissat or Covenanters' Stone.

 
Villages in North Lanarkshire
Mining communities in Scotland